The 2009 Taça da Liga Final was a football match between Benfica and Sporting CP which was held on the 21 March 2009 at Estádio do Algarve, Faro. It was the final match of the 2008–09 Taça da Liga, the 2nd season of the Taça da Liga, a football competition for the 32 teams in the Primeira Liga and the Liga de Honra. Benfica were appearing in their first final, while Sporting were appearing in the final for the second time; having lost the previous season's final to Vitória de Setúbal.

After a goalless and uneventful first half, Sporting scored the first goal of the game through Bruno Pereirinha in the 48th minute. Benfica equalized in the 75th minute through Spanish winger José Antonio Reyes who converted from the penalty spot. After ninety minutes where the game remained tied, the final was to be settled on penalties. After Quim saved Hélder Postiga's penalty, Carlos Martins stepped up to the penalty spot and scored the decisive penalty to clinch Benfica's first Taça da Liga. This was Benfica's first trophy in four years since winning their 31st Primeira Liga in the 2004–05 season.

In the aftermath of the Taça da Liga Final, Sporting's president, coach and two players would face disciplinary action by the LPFP after the incidents in the match involving the decision given by Lucílio Batista following Pedro Silva's supposedly handling the ball in the box, which resulted in Sporting being reduced to ten men and Benfica being awarded a penalty. The following day, the referee publicly assumed that his decision was a mistake.

Background
Sporting CP were appearing in their second final after losing the previous edition's final to Vitória de Setúbal. Benfica were appearing in their very first Taça da Liga final. This final marked the first time that two teams of the Big three would face each other, in a Taça da Liga final.

The last meeting between these two sides prior to the final was a league match, which took place on the 21 February. Sporting defeated Benfica 3–2 at the Estádio José Alvalade. The last meeting between these two sides in a cup competition saw Sporting defeat Benfica, 5–3 in the semi final of the 2007–08 Taça de Portugal.

Route to the final

Note: In all results below, the score of the finalist is given first (H: home; A: away).

Match

Team selection
Both clubs entered the 2009 Taça da Liga Final with players missing due to injury. Sporting CP were missing midfielder Marat Izmailov due to tendinitis in his right knee, as well as left back Leandro Grimi, who was undergoing an operation to his left knee. Benfica entered the final missing goalkeeper Marcelo Moretto, Quique Sánchez Flores' first-choice goalkeeper in the 2008–09 Taça da Liga. Moretto missed the final due to undergoing arthroscopic surgery to his right knee after he sustained an injury during a Benfica training session. Both sides going into the match, saw players who were doubtful for the final. Sporting's Hélder Postiga was a doubt for the final. Benfica's Rúben Amorim was also a doubt for the final after sustaining an injury in a league match, while Carlos Martins and David Suazo were also doubts. These three players would train apart from the rest of the squad in order to be match fit for the final during the week building up to the match.

Paulo Bento's squad selection for the final saw the presence of Hélder Postiga and Leandro Romagnoli who were doubtful going into the game. Paulo Bento's starting eleven saw him start with veteran goalkeeper Tiago ahead of Rui Patrício. Due to Leandro Grimi's injury, Pedro Silva would replace him in the left back position. Quique Sánchez Flores' squad selection for the final saw the inclusion of Carlos Martins, David Suazo and Rúben Amorim who were doubtful prior to the game. Sánchez Flores' starting eleven saw him start Amorim and Suazo. Veteran goalkeeper Quim was selected ahead of José Moreira. Sánchez Flores also selected Miguel Vítor ahead of first-team regular Sidnei in the starting lineup.

Summary
Benfica dominated possession early on and created several chances. The first major chance of the game saw a Benfica counterattack, saw Pablo Aimar brake into Sporting's final third and thread a ball to an unmarked Nuno Gomes who couldn't slot the ball past Tiago. Sporting's most dangerous chance of the first half, saw Simon Vukčević lob the ball over the Benfica defense where he found an unmarked Liédson, who went past Benfica's goalkeeper and fired into the goal at an acute angle but saw his shot blocked on the goal line by David Luiz. The first half would end goalless.

Following the break, Sporting started the second half stronger and scored the first goal of the game. Clever interplay between Simon Vukčević and Marco Caneira down the left hand side saw Caneira cross the ball into the box where Liédson's header hit the crossbar and on the follow up, Bruno Pereirinha slotted the ball past Quim. Following Sporting's goal, its lead could have been doubled but for Quim's save after Fábio Rochemback's corner found Ânderson Polga. Benfica came close to an equalizer following Sporting's most dominant period of the game after José Antonio Reyes' free kick found Luisão whose header hit the crossbar.

Fifteen minutes from the end, Ángel Di María's run would result in Benfica being awarded a penalty after Pedro Silva handled the ball in the box when trying to challenge Di María. Replays showed that the ball hit Silva on the chest. Sporting's Pedro Silva would receive a second yellow card, which resulted in Sporting being a man down. José Antonio Reyes would convert the penalty and slot the ball past Tiago. The game ended in a tie after ninety minutes and was to be settled on penalties. In the penalty shootout after each side had taken three penalties each, Sporting were 2–1 up. The next two penalties which each side took proved to be vital to who would win the cup. Sporting's Derlei and Hélder Postiga missed their penalties, while David Luiz and Carlos Martins converted the penalties to clinch Benfica's first Taça da Liga.

Details

See also
2008–09 Taça da Liga

References

2009
Taca da Liga
Sporting CP matches
S.L. Benfica matches
Taça da Liga Final 2009